William Stuart (7 March 1871 – 20 August 1956) was an Australian cricketer. He played in eight first-class matches for South Australia between 1899 and 1909.

See also
 List of South Australian representative cricketers

References

External links
 

1871 births
1956 deaths
Australian cricketers
South Australia cricketers
Cricketers from Adelaide